Caldy Hill is an area of heath and woodland on a sandstone outcrop on the Wirral Peninsula. The land was bought by Hoylake District Council between 1897 and 1974. The village of Caldy is nearby.

The hill rises to 260 ft where there is a view-finder. From here there are fine views over the estuary of the River Dee to Hilbre Island and the Irish Sea. More distant views range to Snowdonia in the west and Blackpool and the Pennines in the east, more rarely as far as the Lake District to the north, and extremely rarely to the Isle of Man in the north-west.

The Mariners' Beacon stands nearby on the site of an old windmill, which was missed by mariners after it was destroyed by a gale in 1839. Consequently, the Trustees of the Liverpool Docks erected the Mariners' Beacon in 1841.

Calday Grange Grammar School is situated on Caldy Hill.

External links
 Metropolitan Borough of Wirral: Caldy Hill Stapledon Wood

Parks and commons in the Metropolitan Borough of Wirral